Sepp is a given name. When borne by Upper German-speaking people, it is often a nickname for Josef or other names related to Joseph.

Those bearing this name include:
 Joseph Sepp Blatter (born 1936), Swiss football administrator, former president of FIFA
 Josef Bradl (1918-1982), Austria ski jumper and coach
 Sepp Daxenberger (1962–2010), Bavarian politician
 Sepp De Roover (born 1984), Belgian footballer
 Josef Sepp Dietrich (1892–1966), World War II Oberst-Gruppenführer of the Waffen-SS
 Sepp Ferstl (born 1954),  German alpine skier
 Sepp Heckelmiller (born 1943), German former alpine skier
 Josef Sepp Herberger (1897–1977), German football player and manager
 Josef Hirtreiter (1909-1978), German SS sergeant and Holocaust war criminal
 Sepp Hochreiter (born 1967), German computer scientist
 Sepp Holzer (born 1942), Austrian permaculturalist and consultant for natural agriculture
 Josef Hügi (1930-1995), Swiss footballer
 Sepp Kerschbaumer (1913–1964), Italian terrorist
 Sepp Kuss (born 1994), American cyclist
 Sepp Kusstatscher (born 1947), Italian politician
 Sepp Lichtenegger (born 1937), Austrian ski jumper
 Josef Sepp Maier (born 1944), German football goalkeeper
 Josef Oberhauser (1915–1979), German Nazi SS officer
 Josef Sepp Piontek (born 1940), German former football player and manager
 Josef Sepp Puschnig (born 1946), Austrian ice hockey player
 Sepp Reif (born 1937), German ice hockey player
 Sepp Schönmetzler (born 1944), German figure skater, coach and journalist
 Sepp Straffner (1875–1952), Austrian federal railway official and politician
 Josef Uhlmann (1902–1968), German fencer, participated at the 1936 Summer Olympics
 Sepp van den Berg (born 2001), Dutch footballer
 Sepp Walcher (1954–1984), Austrian alpine skier
 Sepp Weiler (1921–1997), German ski jumper
 Sepp Weiß (born 1952), German former footballer
 Josef Wurmheller (1917–1944), German Luftwaffe ace
 Josef Sepp Zeilbauer (born 1952), Austrian retired decathlete

See also 
 Sepp (surname)

Lists of people by nickname
German masculine given names